Clara Lundmark (born 4 April 1999) is a Swedish racing cyclist, who currently rides for UCI Women's Continental Team . She rode in the women's road race at the 2019 UCI Road World Championships in Yorkshire, England.

References

External links
 

1999 births
Living people
Swedish female cyclists
Place of birth missing (living people)
20th-century Swedish women
21st-century Swedish women